Glycyphana stolata, the brown flower beetle is a species of scarab beetle, found in Australia.

References 

Cetoniinae
Beetles of Australia
Beetles described in 1781